Benjamin F. Carter (November 20, 1824 – April 27, 1916) was a member of the Wisconsin State Assembly and the Wisconsin State Senate.

Biography
Carter was born on November 20, 1824 in Concord, New Hampshire. He settled in Harrison, Calumet County, Wisconsin in 1866. Carter was a member of the Assembly during the Sessions of 1874 and 1877. A Democrat, he represented the 22nd District in the Senate during the Sessions of 1880 and 1881. He died in Los Angeles on April 27, 1916.

References

Politicians from Concord, New Hampshire
People from Harrison, Calumet County, Wisconsin
Democratic Party Wisconsin state senators
1824 births
1916 deaths
19th-century American politicians
Democratic Party members of the Wisconsin State Assembly